John Winter is a Wyoming politician who has represented the 28th District of the Wyoming House of Representatives since 2019.

Early life
Winter was born in Cody, Wyoming, United States.

Education
Winter graduated from University of Wyoming in 1972 with a B.S. in range management.

Career
On November 6, 2018, Winter was first elected to the Wyoming House of Representatives, where he represents the 28th district. He won with 75.1% of the vote. Winter assumed office on January 7, 2019. Winter is a Republican.

He defeated Democrat Levi Shinkle on November 3, 2020 with 81.6% of the vote. Following his reelection, he supported an attempt to get the Wyoming Attorney General to join Texas in a lawsuit seeking to overturn presidential election results in four states.

In February 2021, he voted in favor of a bill that would have "given students the tools to help friends with suicidal thoughts."

Personal life
Winter is a member of the Church of Jesus Christ of Latter-day Saints. Winter is married to S. Diane Winter, and has ten children. As of November 2021, he has 33 grandchildren.

References

Living people
Year of birth missing (living people)
University of Wyoming alumni
People from Cody, Wyoming
Latter Day Saints from Wyoming
Republican Party members of the Wyoming House of Representatives
21st-century American politicians